Pulu may refer to:

People
 Augustine Pulu (born 1990), New Zealand rugby player
 Finau Pulu (born 1987), New Zealand netball player
 Kisi Pulu (born 1979), rugby player
 Leivaha Pulu (born 1990), Tonga rugby player
 Peter Pulu (born 1975), Papua New Guinea athlete
 Pulu or Tiglath-Pileser III, king of Assyria 
 Pulu Poumele (1972–2016), American American football player
 Toni Pulu (born 1989), rugby player
 Viliami Pulu (born 1960), Tongan boxer
 ʻIsileli Pulu (born 1957), Tongan politician

Places
 Pulu, Nepal

Other
 Pulu (album), by Ismo Alanko Säätiö (1998)
 Pulu (material), a silky material obtained from the fibers of a tree fern of Hawaii
 Pulu, ancient precursor of the game polo

See also

 
 Agni Poolu (disambiguation) including "Agni Pulu"